Zapałów  (Zhapaliv) is a village in the administrative district of Gmina Wiązownica, within Jarosław County, Subcarpathian Voivodeship, in south-eastern Poland.

References

Villages in Jarosław County